Pterolophia aeneipennis is a species of beetle in the family Cerambycidae. It was described by Stephan von Breuning and Heyrovsky in 1964.

References

aeneipennis
Beetles described in 1964